Ben Taylor or Benjamin Taylor may refer to:

Sports
 Ben Taylor (American football) (born 1978), former American football linebacker
 Ben Taylor (first baseman) (1927–1999), American Major League Baseball first baseman
 Ben Taylor (pitcher, born 1889) (1889–1946), American professional baseball pitcher
 Ben Taylor (pitcher, born 1992) (born 1992), American professional baseball pitcher
 Ben Taylor (Negro leagues) (1888–1953), Negro league baseball player
 Benjamin Taylor (cricketer) (1873–1938), English cricketer active 1902–09 who played for Nottinghamshire
 Benjamin Taylor (field hockey) (born 1976), Australian field hockey player

Politics
 Benjamin I. Taylor (1877–1946), U.S. Representative from New York
 Benjamin Taylor (Australian politician) (1843–1886), member of the South Australian House of Assembly

Other
 Ben Cuimermara Taylor (born 1938), Noongar elder from the south-west of Western Australia
 Benedict Taylor (musician) (born 1982), British musician
 Benedict Taylor (born 1960), aka Ben Taylor, British actor
 Benjamin Taylor (author) (born 1952), American author
 Benjamin B. Taylor (born c. 1947), American former journalist and publisher of The Boston Globe
 Ben Taylor, a character from children’s show Postman Pat and the 3D animated children’s film Postman Pat The Movie